Dhulikhel Hospital, a Kathmandu University hospital, is an independent, not for profit, non-government hospital in Dhulikhel, Kavrepalanchok, Nepal.

History
The hospital was conceived and supported by the Dhulikhel community, as a health service provider. The hospital was inaugurated by the late king Birendra Bir Bikram Shah Dev in 1996, as a collaborative project of the Dhulikhel Municipality, NepaliMed and Dhulikhel Health Service Association. The hospital was started to provide outpatient service, 24 hours emergency, inpatient from beginning. Dr. Ram KM Shrestha and Dr. Rajendra Koju were 2 doctors to start the affordable health care services from this hospital.

Service area

The hospital covers a population of 2.7 million people from Bhaktapur, Dolakha, Kavrepalanchowk, Ramechhap, Sindhupalchok, Sindhuli and other districts. Dhulikhel Hospital has provided services to people from more than 50 out of 75 districts of the country. About 2.7 million people from Kavrepalanchowk, Sindhupalchowk, Bhaktapur, Dolakha, Ramechhap, Sindhuli, Kathmandu, Lalitpur and surrounding districts are served in a year. There are significant number of cases referred from different parts of the country. Since opening of Banepa Bardibas highway connecting eastern Terai, the number of patients from Terain region has significantly increased.

University Hospital
Dhulikhel hospital is also the university hospital for all the medical programs run under the collaboration with Kathmandu University (constituent medical programs of Kathmandu University). Kathmandu University School of Medical Sciences is running MBBS, BDS, BSc. Nursing, BNS, BPT, MD/MS in different specialties in this hospital.

Community Health

Department of Community Programs
The department has expanded since 1996. It now works as a coordinating unit between the hospital’s various medical departments and numerous rural communities that previously had no access to immediate healthcare facilities. The department attempts to address health issues in remote areas through a holistic approach; quality service delivery; rational community-based methods; innovative public health interventions; and effective partnership programs. It aims to implement these measures and services through rigorous monitoring and evaluation methods, in order to ensure that its main objective, to act as a coordinating unit for other departments in the hospital, is successfully carried out.

Currently, the work of the Department of Community Programmes can be categorised as the following:
 Health Service Programmes
 Public Health Programmes
 Partnership Programmes
 Global Health Programmes
Majority of the work of the Department of Community Programs is carried out by the outreach centers. At the 14 outreach centers and one school health clinic round-the-clock healthcare services are provided to the people living in the catchment areas.  All of these outreach centers were started after thorough discussions and meetings addressing the community directly about their needs, aims, and goals concerning healthcare.  The outreaches not only provide basic health services, but also a platform on which all the community programs begin. Many preventive, promotive and curative services are provided to all outreach rural communities. Various NGOs and INGOs also provide services to the community at grassroots level through the outreach centers.

Outreach Centres

Kavrepalanchok District 
 Baluwa Health Centre
 Bolde Health Centre
 Dapcha Health Centre
 Kattike Deurali Health Centre
 Salambu Health Centre
 Dhungkharka Health Centre

Sindhupalchok District
Bahunepati Health Centre
Hindi Health Centre
Manekharka Health Centre
Lamosangu Temporary Basic Health Care Unit
Yangrima School Health Clinic

Dhading District
Chattre Deurali Health Centre

Lalitpur District
Godamchaur Health Centre

Solukhumbu District
Kharikhola Health Centre
Dorpu Health Centre

Dolakha District
Kirnetar Health Centre
Gaurishankar Community General Hospital

Parbat District
Phalebas Health Center

Nuwakot District
Thansing Health Center

Sindhuli District
Dumja Health Center

Services
Dhulikhel Hospital ensures that all paramedical staff at the outreach centers receive regular training and are on-call 24 hours a day in case of emergencies.  Regular doctor visits are scheduled to the outreach centers. These centers are also used as a means of providing higher level specialized care.  In 2011-2012 year alone we organized 244 specialized camps in the following areas in different rural areas of Nepal:
 General Surgery
 Ophthalmology
 Cardiology
 Gastroenterology
 Obstetrics & Gynecology
 Orthopedic
 Urosurgery
 Psychiatry
 Physiotherapy
 Paediatrics
 Otolaryngology ENT
 Dermatology
 Dentistry Dental
 Gynecology
 Neurosurgery
 Vascular surgery

At Dhulikhel Hospital, Kathmandu University Hospital, outreach placements are a part of all the medical and paramedical students’ studies, which encourages them to be actively involved in community healthcare.  In the past, students have stayed at various outreach centers for a maximum of two weeks where they have been on-hand to cater to the needs of patients 24 hours a day.

Partnership Programs
In addition to training the hospital's own staff at the Outreach Centes, training courses for health personnel from government health centres are also conducted. The partnership work covers other areas of Nepal. Technical assistance is provided to eight hospitals all over the Nepal.

The partners include:
 Ampipal Hospital, Gorkha District
 Tamakoshi Cooperative Hospital, Ramechhap District
 Dolpa Health Centre, Dolpa District
 Sahaj Community Hospital, Nawalparasi District
 Poyan Health Centre, Solukhumbhu District
 Phalebas Health Centre, Parbat District
 Necha Health Centre, Okhaldhunga District
 Bayalpata Hospital, Achham District

Public Health Programs
Through the Department of Community Programs, the staff at the Dhulikhel Hospital coordinate many [public health] programs designed to uplift communities by improving their standard of living. Various public health programs have been conducted: plantation programs around schools and villages; first aid training; hygiene and sanitation teaching for school children; awareness programs for women (for issues like cervical cancer, breast cancer, uterine prolapse); and mental health awareness programs for both women and school children.

Current Public Health Programs include:
Plantation Programs and Community Forestry
Micro-Finance Programs
Micro-Insurance Programs
Women's Awareness Programs
School Health Programs
Occupational Health Programs
Improved Cooking Stoves Construction

Plantation Programs and Community Forestry 
Plantation programs is one of the Department of Community Programs’ newest initiatives. The program raises awareness on deforestation and climate change in the rural communities and incorporates awareness campaigns into local school curricula. Thus far, two schools have been involved and more than 1,005 trees have been planted.

Micro-Finance Programs
The Micro-Finance program was in 2008 at the Bahunepati Health Centre. Today, Dhulikhel Hospital has 31 micro-finance groups in five outreach centers (Bahunepati, Kattike Deurali, Dapcha, Solombhu, Baluwa).

The micro-finance programs were created to financially assist women in rural communities. Each micro-finance group consists of 10 women with a nominated leader from their own community, who ensures that the loan is paid back in monthly installments, with an additional four percent interest rate. The interest in turn generates a sum of money for another woman to join the group. The women from the micro-finance groups have gone on to purchase animals for livestock farming such as pigs, goats, and chickens; or have invested in materials to start their own small businesses like candle-making. To date, over 300 women have benefited from the program.

Micro-insurance Programs
Micro-insurance Programs were launched at the end of 2010. For just 50 rupees per month, the Micro-insurance Program has ensured that all the women involved in the micro-finance programs and their children are covered for basic medical healthcare.

Women's Awareness Programs
The staff from the Department of Community Programs and the Gynaecology/Obstetrics department work together within the outreach centers to find out the needs of women and how they can be helped.
 
In 2011-2012 a total of 29,681 women from different rural vicinities were involved in the Awareness Programs. The major topics discussed were: cervical cancer, uterine prolapse, breast cancer, menstural hygiene, and tuberculosis.

The Department of Community Programs is also raising awareness on teenage pregnancies, dysmenorrhoea, family planning, and sexually transmitted infections.

Dhulikhel Hospital operates on all uterine prolapse cases without charge. Due to societal restrictions many women in rural areas do not talk about their cases and cases often come to the hospital with stage three uterine prolapse. Since 2008, the department has specifically recruited nurses from the hospital for awareness programs on uterine prolapse in the outreach centers.

School Health Programs
This program through education highlights the importance of hygiene and healthcare for school children and teachers. The School Health Programs are focused on encouraging education on topics such as hygiene, toilet use, and first aid.

Working with the District Government Office, Adolescent Health Programs and extra-curricular School Health Clubs have been formed. Furthermore, first aid trainings have been provided for teachers from 11 schools in cooperation with local governmental health center staff. Between 2011 and 2012 the re were 72 various health programs at 120 different schools. 10,9384 students were screened for dental, ENT, ophthalmic problems.

Occupational Health Programs
Farmers in Nepal face severe health risks due to their heavy use of pesticides in crop farming. The Department of Community Programs is conducting awareness programs targeting these farmers, with regards to the proper use of pesticides in crop farming.  The program aims to first raise the issue of pesticides as a health hazard amongst farmers and their families, and then tackle the increasingly widespread and improper use of pesticides.

See also
 List of hospitals in Nepal

References

External links

Hospital buildings completed in 1996
Hospitals established in 1996
Hospitals in Nepal
Organisations associated with Kathmandu University
1996 establishments in Nepal
Buildings and structures in Kavrepalanchok District